Entombed, or entomb, may refer to:

 To entomb is to inter a body in a tomb
 Burial of Jesus, also known as the Entombment of Christ

Video games
 Entombed (Atari 2600), a 1982 video game by US Games
 Entombed (video game), a 1985 video game from Ultimate Play the Game
 Entombed, a 1997 video game by WizardWorks

Other
 Entombed (band), a Swedish death metal band
 Entombed (album), 1997
 a novel by Linda Fairstein
 "Entombed", a season 3 episode in the TV series Mickey Mouse
 "Entombed", a season 2 episode in the TV series Star Wars: The Bad Batch